Embracing the Wind is the fifth album from American new-age pianist Kevin Kern. As with his preceding and succeeding albums, it is an album of instrumental songs. It was released on April 3, 2001.

The song "From This Day Forward" is dedicated to Kern's now-wife Pamela Gibbs; according to the liner notes, they celebrated their wedding on 26 June 2001.

Track listing
All compositions by Kevin Kern.

"Blossom on the Wind" - 5:42
"Through Your Eyes" - 3:46
"Childhood Remembered" - 4:27
"The Silence of Knowing" - 4:30
"Above the Clouds" - 5:23
"Bathed in Dawn's Light" - 5:08
"From This Day Forward" - 4:48
"A Secret Grove" - 5:12
"Fantasia's Lullaby" - 3:43
"A Gentle Whisper" - 4:04

Liner Notes
The wind blows / The grasses bend / And the dance / Is a joy to behold.

Personnel 
Credits taken from the liner notes.

 Kevin Kern – piano, keyboards, producer, composer, arrangement
 Terence Yallop – executive producer

References

External links 
 Kevin Kern's official website
 Kevin Kern at Real Music

Embracing the Wind
Kevin Kern albums